Liesje Sadonius  (born 6 August 1974) is a Flemish singer-songwriter and a spiritual life coach. She is mostly known for her work as the lead singer of the Belgian trip hop band Hooverphonic.

Hooverphonic
Sadonius became the lead singer of Hooverphonic (then Hoover) in 1995. The band recorded their debut album A New Stereophonic Sound Spectacular in 1996 and gained international recognition through featuring of the Stereophonic's track "2Wicky" on the soundtrack of Bernardo Bertolucci's 1996 film Stealing Beauty. Shortly after the album release Sadonius left on amicable terms.

After Hooverphonic-Suzanina
After leaving Hooverphonic, Sadonius launched her solo career as "Suzanina" and worked with various bands in Belgium and Europe under the nickname of Suzanina, collaborating with Airlock, Frank Duchêne, Ronny Mosuse, K's Choice's Gert Bettens, and Rik Rosseels. Her debut album was titled "Heavenly Juice" (2007, 2010).

Due to certain childhood experiences, she developed an interest in holistic healing and spirituality, which led her to set up a spiritual life coaching business.

Discography

Albums with Hooverphonic
A New Stereophonic Sound Spectacular (1996)

EPs (Solo)
Heavenly Juice (Demo) (2007)
Heavenly Juice (2010)

Singles with Hooverphonic
Inhaler (1996)
2Wicky (1996)
Wardrope (1996)
Barabas (1996)

References

Flemish musicians
Living people
English-language singers from Belgium
20th-century Belgian women singers
20th-century Belgian singers
21st-century Belgian women singers
21st-century Belgian singers
Belgian singer-songwriters
1975 births